Amman is the capital and largest city in Jordan.

Amman may also refer to:

 Amman (Spokane, Washington), a building listed on the U.S. National Register of Historic Places
 Amman (surname)
 Amman (TV series), a 2020 Indian Tamil-language television series
 River Amman, a river of south Wales
 Amtmann, a mediaeval Swiss official
 Mariamman, the South Indian Hindu goddess of disease and rain

See also 
 Aman (disambiguation)
 Amann
 Ammann (disambiguation)
 Amtmann
 Oman (disambiguation)